Rudy Halmaert (born 20 June 1990) is a French pair skater who competed with different partners for France, Lithuania, and the Czech Republic. With Alexandra Herbríková for the Czech Republic, he is the 2012 Czech national champion and placed 13th at the 2012 European Championships.

Programs 
(with Herbríková)

(with Oradauskaite)

Competitive highlights

With Herbríková for the Czech Republic

With Letscher for France

With Oradauskaite for Lithuania

References

External links 

 
 
 

French male pair skaters
Czech male pair skaters
1990 births
Living people
People from Enghien-les-Bains
Sportspeople from Val-d'Oise